Joseph Bartoch (born January 3, 1983) is a former competition swimmer from Canada, who specialized in the butterfly events.  He claimed a bronze medal as a member of the third-place Canadian team in the 4x100-metre medley relay at the 2007 Pan American Games in Rio de Janeiro, Brazil.  He competed at the 2008 Summer Olympics in Beijing in the 100-metre butterfly and the 4x100-metre medley relay, and in the same events at the 2012 Summer Olympics in London.

See also
 World record progression 4 × 100 metres medley relay

References

1983 births
Living people
Canadian male butterfly swimmers
Olympic swimmers of Canada
UNLV Rebels men's swimmers
Swimmers at the 2007 Pan American Games
Swimmers at the 2008 Summer Olympics
Swimmers at the 2012 Summer Olympics
Swimmers from London, Ontario
World record setters in swimming
Pan American Games bronze medalists for Canada
Pan American Games medalists in swimming
Medalists at the 2007 Pan American Games